German submarine U-663 was a Type VIIC U-boat built for Nazi Germany's Kriegsmarine for service during World War II.
She was laid down on 31 March 1941 by Deutsche Werft, Hamburg as yard number 812, launched on 26 March 1942 and commissioned on 14 May 1942 under Kapitänleutnant Heinrich Schmid.

Design
German Type VIIC submarines were preceded by the shorter Type VIIB submarines. U-663 had a displacement of  when at the surface and  while submerged. She had two shafts and two  propellers.

U-663 was fitted with five  torpedo tubes (four fitted at the bow and one at the stern), fourteen torpedoes, one  SK C/35 naval gun, 220 rounds, and a  C/30 anti-aircraft gun. The boat had a complement of between forty-four and sixty.

Service history
The boat's career began with training at 5th U-boat Flotilla on 14 May 1942, followed by active service on 1 October 1942 as part of the 11th Flotilla. After only one month, she transferred to the 9th Flotilla on 1 November 1942, for the remainder of her service.

Wolfpacks
U-663 took part in four wolfpacks, namely:
 Drachen (22 November – 3 December 1942)
 Panzer (3 – 9 December 1942)
 Büffel (9 – 14 December 1942)
 Seeteufel (21 – 30 March 1943)

Fate
U-663 was sunk on 8 May 1943 in the Bay of Biscay in position , by depth charges from a No. 10 Squadron RAAF Sunderland. All hands were lost.

Summary of raiding history

References

Bibliography

External links

German Type VIIC submarines
1942 ships
U-boats commissioned in 1942
Ships lost with all hands
U-boats sunk in 1943
U-boats sunk by Australian aircraft
World War II shipwrecks in the Atlantic Ocean
World War II submarines of Germany
Ships built in Hamburg
Maritime incidents in May 1943